Wake Up Sid is a 2009 Indian Hindi-language coming-of-age comedy-drama film written and directed by Ayan Mukerji and produced by Hiroo Yash Johar and Karan Johar under Dharma Productions, with UTV Motion Pictures as distributor and visual effects contributed by the Prime Focus Group. Set in contemporary Mumbai, the film tells the story of a careless rich college brat, Siddharth Mehra (Ranbir Kapoor) who is taught the value of owning up to responsibility by Aisha Bannerjee (Konkona Sen Sharma), an aspiring writer from Kolkata. 

Wake Up Sid released on 2 October 2009, and proved to be a commercial success at the box office. It received widespread critical acclaim upon release, with high praise for its novel concept, themes, direction, screenplay, soundtrack and performances of the cast. 

At the 55th Filmfare Awards, Wake Up Sid received 9 nominations, including Best Film, Best Director (Mukerji), Best Actor (Kapoor) and Best Supporting Actress (Pathak), and won 3 awards – Best Actor (Critics) (Kapoor), Best Female Playback Singer (Kavita Seth for "Iktara") and Best Debut Director (Mukerji, tying with Zoya Akhtar for Luck by Chance). The film is now available on Netflix.

Plot 

Siddharth "Sid" Mehra (Ranbir Kapoor) is an extremely lazy and careless college student in his early twenties living in Mumbai who does not know what he wants to pursue. He hates college and his creativity and talent for photography are often disregarded and ignored. He barely stays awake at night to study for the final exams and forces himself to sleep. His father Ram Mehra (Anupam Kher) is a wealthy businessman who wants him to excel while his mother Sarita Mehra (Supriya Pathak) is a housewife who pampers him. 

Sid walks out of his final exam early, feeling deprived of sleep and insecure about his lack of direction in life compared to his friends. At his college's farewell party, Sid meets and befriends Aisha Banerjee (Konkona Sen Sharma), an aspiring writer who recently moved from her hometown of Kolkata. With Sid's help, Aisha rents a flat in a small apartment and lands a job at Mumbai Beat (based on Time Out! Mumbai), a hip magazine company run by editor-in-chief Kabir Choudhary (Rahul Khanna). 

When the final exam results arrive, Sid learns that he failed while the rest of his classmates and friends passed, delaying his graduation for at least another year. He vents his frustration on his friends and storms off. At his house, Sid gets angry at his parents and ends up hastily leaving the house after a livid blowout. Aisha allows him to temporarily stay at her apartment but finds him to be unorganized and careless with her house. One night, she loses her temper and berates him for his inability to look after himself. Sid confides in her that he now realizes his dependence on his father's wealth, motivating him to seek work of his own. 

Aisha helps Sid land a job as a photography intern at Mumbai Beat. The internship motivates Sid to be more responsible and productive, and he begins helping out with chores around the house. He eventually gets hired full-time at Mumbai Beat and receives his first paycheck. He immediately goes to visit his father in his office for the first time in months to show him his paycheck, leading the two to tearfully reconcile. Aisha goes on several dates with Kabir, but realizes they have little in common and that she has developed feelings for Sid. Aisha is heartbroken to learn that Sid is moving back in with his family and lashes out at him, causing Sid to leave without realizing Aisha's feelings for him. 

The day after Sid moves back into his family's house, he receives the latest issue of Mumbai Beat, which contains both his photographs as well as Aisha's article of her life in Mumbai and love for an unnamed person. Realizing that the article is about her feelings for him, Sid immediately rushes from his car through the rain to the seafront where Aisha is. He confesses his love for her and they both embrace.

Cast 

 Konkona Sen Sharma as Aisha Banerjee
 Ranbir Kapoor as Siddharth "Sid" Mehra
 Anupam Kher as Ram Mehra
 Supriya Pathak as Sarita Mehra
 Rahul Khanna as Kabir Choudhary
 Kashmera Shah as Sonia Gill
 Shikha Talsania as Laxmi Inder Advani
 Namit Das as Rishi Atul Raheja
 Krutika Bolaki as Neha, Rishi's love interest
 Sid Pendkalkar as Sanjay "Sanju" Bapat
 Sanat Sawant as Jay Mehra
 Shruti Bapna as Debbie
 Nitin Chatterjee as Restaurant Steward
 Kainaz Motivala as Tanya Lathia
 Mukesh Rawal as Mr. Lathia, Tanya's Father, Ram Mehra's close friend
 Atisha Naik as Sanju's mother
 Asif Ali Baig as Raj
 Munir Kabani as Amit, Head Photographer at Mumbai Beat
 Mohsin Ali Khan as Chhotu, Sid's servant
 Huzefa Gadiwala

Release

Box office
Wake Up Sid opened well in India and overseas markets. It was number one in the box office during its first and second weeks, number four during its third week, and number three during its fourth week.

In the United Kingdom, the film collected US$165,934, while in the US, the collections were US$717,977. By its fourth week, it grossed $348,351 in New Zealand and the United Kingdom. Do Knot Disturb also released during the same time, but Wake Up Sid got a larger portion of the audience.

Reception
Wake Up Sid received positive reviews from critics upon release, who praised its novel screenplay, direction, dialogues, soundtrack and performances of the cast. 

Subhash K. Jha gave Wake Up Sid a rave review stating that it is, "a triumph on many levels [...] Ayan Mukerji takes the age-old dramatic conflicts of our commercial cinema into understated corridors. Rajeev Masand of CNN-IBN gave the film 3.5 out of 5 stars, stating that Wake Up Sid "has its heart in the right place and marks the breakout of a bright, shining star who has come into his own so early in his acting career. Watch it, and be awestruck by Ranbir." Taran Adarsh of Bollywood Hungama gave the film 4 out of 5 stars as well as a "thumbs up" stating that it is "strongly recommended."

Mayank Shekhar of the Hindustan Times gave it 3.5 out of 4 stars and states, "Wake Up Sid belongs to a sweet genre that, without doubt, flows on from Farhan Akhtar's Dil Chahta Hai (2001): part-Hollywood; part-Bollywood; mostly coming-of-age; subtly romantic; largely original; authentic in feel; light in weight; English in expression; Hindi in language." Avijit Ghosh of The Times of India gave it 3.5 out of 4 stars and suggests that, "Wake Up Sid becomes a sort of template of how GenNow navigate their lives: deal with their own little rebellions, find meaning to their own definitions of independence and handle their own set of mistakes. It feels good when the two friends finally meet in driving rain under the grey skies by the sea. Refreshing and heart-warming, Wake Up Sid really puts you in the mood for love." Noyon Jyoti Parasara of AOL India gave it 3.5 out of 5 stars and praised the director saying, "Ayan Mukerji arrives in style and manages to leave his own mark on the film despite having a producer like Karan Johar whose other productions always tend to have his stamp. Wake Up Sid really puts you in the mood for love."

Joginder Tuteja of the Indo-Asian News Service (IANS) calls the film "flawless" and gave it 3.5 stars out of 5. He states: "There are 5 things that make Wake Up Sid a delightful affair. It has a constant flow throughout; no over-the-top or understated drama; no ultra-emotional strangulation of audiences; absolutely no yuppie cool dude act; and last but not the least, this is an original and refreshing story." Rachel Saltz of The New York Times argues that: "With no big production numbers (songs play over montage sequences), a quiet style and credible characters, Wake Up Sid is Bollywood in an indie mood, a film for people like Aisha and Sid: young and educated. It may not be as hip as Bombay Beat, the magazine where the two work, but it shows that Mr. Mukerji is a director to watch."

In one point of criticism, Sudhish Kamath of Chennai's The Hindu labeled the closing moments as a "stock-ending" and noted that, despite the film's overall effectiveness, the ending "leaves you a little disappointed." Variety's Joe Leydon found the film "instantly forgettable", but praised the performances of Sharma and Kapoor, as well noting how "effortlessly appealing" the film is, stating: "...this atypically low-key Bollywood romantic comedy somehow manages to remain pleasantly diverting throughout its 138-minute running time."

Controversy
On 2 October, Maharashtra Navnirman Sena supporters protested to halt the screening of Wake Up Sid in Mumbai and Pune. The MNS objected the use of the word "Bombay" instead of "Mumbai" in the movie.

Shooting
Wake Up Sid was entirely shot in Mumbai, covering the areas of South Mumbai and Bandra. The college sequence was shot at H.R. College of Commerce and Economics near Churchgate, Mumbai.

Trivia
 Ranbir Kapoor was the original choice for the lead role. Director Ayan Mukerji wrote the film keeping him in his mind.
 Like Ranbir, Konkona Sen Sharma was the original choice for the role of Aisha Banerjee. In an Interview to a TV channel, Ranbir said that Ayan had already thought about casting her in the film but he didn't tell that to him. However, after the narration of the script it was Ranbir himself who coincidentally recommended Konkona's name to Ayan mainly because she suited the character and no other actress from his generation could have played Aisha better than Konkona.
 Ayan Mukherji took around one and a half year to write the story, script and screenplay of the movie. He then narrated the script to Karan Johar who approved the script in one narration and decided to produce it.
 The song "Iktara" was not originally used in the soundtrack. Ranbir loved the song in the background and he wanted to use the song officially in some other film, if it is not used properly in the film. However, later the song was used in two different versions - Female and Male that were picturized on Konkona and Ranbir respectively.

Television Rights
Wake Up Sid's television rights were sold to Colors at the time of its premiere, whence it would subsequently premiere on UTV Movies, and later Bindass. Eventually, after the Disney acquisition of Star India, the film began premiering with multiple slot re-runs on Star Gold Select.

Home Video
Wake Up Sid's DVD were published by UTV Home Video.

Awards and nominations

Soundtrack
The music was composed by Shankar–Ehsaan–Loy with lyrics by Javed Akhtar. The soundtrack was released on 21 August 2009. Amit Trivedi, who provided the film's background score, guest-composed the song "Iktara", its reprise and extended version, all of which were written by his frequent collaborator Amitabh Bhattacharya. Song "Boondon Ke Moti", an extension to Iktara, sung by Salim Merchant remains unreleased till date.

Reception

The reactions towards the music were favorable. Chandrima Pal of Rediff gave the album 3.5 stars, stating, "the music sticks to the brief. It is hip, urban and bubbly, and unhurried. And thanks to Shankar Ehsaan Loy's musicianship, it is a slick, well-balanced production". Joginder Tuteja (Bollywood Hungama) gave it 3.5 stars out of possible 5, suggesting that, "this may not really turn out to be the bestseller of the year but should certainly be a perfect fit for the narrative."

References

External links
 Official Trailer – Dharma Productions
 
 
 

2000s Hindi-language films
Films set in Mumbai
2000s coming-of-age comedy-drama films
2009 romantic comedy-drama films
2009 films
Films shot in Mumbai
Indian coming-of-age comedy-drama films
Indian romantic comedy-drama films
UTV Motion Pictures films
Films scored by Amit Trivedi
2009 comedy films
2009 drama films
Films directed by Ayan Mukerji